Shaily Lipa (born May 22, 1974, in Tel Aviv) is an Israeli cookbook author, culinary editor, recipe developer, content creator and TV cookery show host.

Background
Shaily Lipa was born in Tel Aviv and raised there and in Ra'anana, the daughter of Tel Aviv natives whose origins are in Greece and Turkey. Her Greek grandparent is a Holocaust survivor who survived Auschwitz. She was raised in a family that dines well, entertains and talks about food. 

She never studied formally in any cookery school, but she attended several cooking courses. Her academic studies include a bachelor's degree in biology from the agriculture faculty of the Hebrew University of Jerusalem.

Career
At the time her son Itamar was born, Lipa sought a career change compatible with raising him. She won first place in a recipe contest held by the "Gourmet" supplement of the Israeli women's magazine At (Hebrew: "you" [f.]). Her prizes were a trip to Paris and her own food column.

In summer 2005 she published an article about healthy food in the magazine Al Hashulchan (Hebrew: On the Table). In the years 2009 – 2011 she authored a food column in the Israeli mainstream daily Maariv. Since November 2011 she has hosted, along with other chefs, a food section on the lifestyle television show hosted by Odetta Schwartz.

She participated in the third season of the Matkon Batuach (Hebrew: Safe Recipe) show on Israel TV's Channel 2, together with other prominent Israeli chefs.

In May 2012 she started hosting her own TV cookery show, Habait shel Shaily (Hebrew: Shaily's Home) on TV Channel 2's Reshet division. In each installment she prepares five easy-to-make dishes. 

In September 2015 she started hosting her TV cookery show "Super Shaily" on TV channel 10. In each installment she cooks 4–5 courses meal and hosts a DIY (Do It Yourself) expert.

Lipa has developed recipes for food industry companies including Tnuva, Shimrit, Sunfrost, Maadanot, Hardoof, Gad Milk, and Quaker Oats.

In May 2017 she started hosting her new TV cookery show, Matkon le-Chisachon (Hebrew: Recipe for saving) on TV Channel 2's Keshet division. In each installment she prepares five easy and minimalistic dishes.

By the beginning of 2017, Shaily Lipa had written 11 cookbooks as well as a children's book about superfoods. She is also the culinary editor of two of Mickey Shemo's books, published by Al Hashulchan (English: On the Table): The Best of Mickey Shemo, 2009 (Hebrew: Mickey Shemo Ha’meytav); Sabbaths and Jewish Holidays with Mickey Shemo, 2011 (Hebrew: Shabatot vechagim im Mickey Shemo).

Personal life
Shaily Lipa is married to the financial entrepreneur, Rafi Lipa. The couple has two children.

In August 2010, after her father was diagnosed with ALS, she joined the Prize4Life organization.

Bibliography

Titles in Hebrew
Pashut Le-Areach ("Entertaining Made Easy"), with Ariela Yariv-Gutenberg, 2005
Hagim ("[Jewish] Holiday Entertaining"), 2007
Ha-Mitbach ha-Bari shel Al ha-Shulchan ("The Healthy Kitchen"), with Orly Peli-Bronshtein and dietician Michal Langberg; 2007
Mitbach Bari le-Yeladim ("Healthy Kitchen for Kids"), with Michal Langberg, 2010
120 ha-Klasikot shel Shaily ("Shaily's 120 Classics"), 2011
Ha-Bayit shel Shaily ("At Home with Shaily"), 2012
Ha-Mitbach ha-Balkani Sheli ("My Balkan Kitchen"), 2014
 Elisheba ve-sayeret ha-Superfood ("Elisheba and her Superfoods A-team), 2016 
 Shaily mevashelet – Chagei Tishrei ("Shaily cooks – Tishrei Holidays"), 2016 
 Shaily mevashelet – Chag ha-'Aviv ("Shaily cooks – Passover Holiday"), 2017
 100% Tivey ("100% Natural"), 2017

Titles in English
"Deliciously Healthy" – Vegetables, Leisure Arts, Inc, 2012

External links

Shaily Lipa's Passover recipes from "The Nosher" blog, MyJewishLearning website (2012)
Shaily's Balkan Beat cookbook review from Al Hashulchan culinary magazine, The Jerusalem Post online (2014)

References

Israeli women journalists
Israeli television personalities
Israeli women television presenters
Israeli people of Greek-Jewish descent
Israeli people of Turkish-Jewish descent
Robert H. Smith Faculty of Agriculture, Food and Environment alumni
Living people
Year of birth missing (living people)